Dennis Harris is a former professional rugby league footballer who played in the 1960s and 1970s.

Playing career

County League appearances
Dennis Harris played in Castleford's victory in the Yorkshire County League during the 1964–65 season.

BBC2 Floodlit Trophy Final appearances
Dennis Harris played , i.e. number 2, in Castleford's 8-5 victory over Leigh in the 1967 BBC2 Floodlit Trophy Final during the 1967–68 season at Headingley Rugby Stadium, Leeds on Saturday 16 January 1968.

References

External links
Search for "Harris" at rugbyleagueproject.org
Dennis Harris Memory Box Search at archive.castigersheritage.com
Denis Harris Memory Box Search at archive.castigersheritage.com

Living people
Castleford Tigers players
English rugby league players
Place of birth missing (living people)
Rugby league wingers
Year of birth missing (living people)